Tour-en-Bessin (literally Tour in Bessin) is a commune in the Calvados department in the Normandy region in northwestern France.

History

World War II
After the liberation of the area by Allied Forces in 1944, engineers of the Ninth Air Force IX Engineering Command began construction of a combat Advanced Landing Ground outside of the town.  Declared operational on 28 July, the airfield was designated as "A-13", it was used by several fighter and bomber units until mid-September.   Afterward, the airfield was used for resupply and casualty transport.  It was closed in early December.

Population

See also
Communes of the Calvados department

References

Communes of Calvados (department)